Denis Trautmann (born 15 August 1972) is a retired German race walker.

Achievements

References

1972 births
Living people
German male racewalkers
Athletes (track and field) at the 2000 Summer Olympics
Olympic athletes of Germany